The Women's Foil Individual B wheelchair fencing competition at the 2004 Summer Paralympics was held on 20 September at the Helliniko Fencing Hall.

The event was won by Chan Yui Chong, representing .

Results

Preliminaries

Pool A

Pool B

Pool C

Competition bracket

References

Wheelchair fencing at the 2004 Summer Paralympics
Para